Netherlands–South Korea relations are foreign relations between South Korea and the Netherlands. The Netherlands have an embassy in Seoul, while South Korea has an embassy in The Hague.

History

Pre-20th century
Korea was relatively unknown to Westerners, including the Dutch, and compared to neighbouring countries such as China or Japan, Korea was not eager to trade with the west. 

Initially, the Dutch (also called Hwaran (花蘭)) were thought to be part of the Nanman people by the Koreans. The first Dutchman attested to have made contact with Korea was Jan Jansz Weltevree, who arrived in n 1627 to find drinking water and settled in Korea. Later Hendrik Hamel, who unintentionally arrived in 1653, recorded Weltevree and Korea in his journal. 

Hamel escaped in 1666 and returned to Amsterdam in 1668. Hamel's journals and his descriptions of Korea led, the Dutch East India Company to task a ship (the Corea) with exploring this nation, with expectations of resources and flourishing trade opportunities. This attempt to directly trade with Korea and bypass Japanese middlemen, however, was rejected by Japanese authorities. The Dutch showed interest in Korea regarding its role in producing porcelain, as the Qing had placed an export ban. In 1669, Batavian officials were eager to forge relations with Korea, fearing that the Portuguese in Macau might do so first.

20th century
The Netherlands recognized South Korea in 1949 and officially launched diplomatic relations in 1961.

Korean War
The Dutch participated in the Korean War as part of the United Nations.

Economy
The two countries forged an economic technology cooperation treaty in 1982.

Sports
The two countries competed in baseball at the 1996 Summer Olympics, where South Korea defeated the Netherlands for its only win.

In the 2002 World Cup, the South Korean national team entered the semifinals under the Dutch football manager Guus Hiddink, who was later made the first honorary citizen of South Korea on 2 July 2002.

In the 2020 Summer Olympics the countries faced off in Women's Handball. In the highest-scoring match at the Games, Netherlands beat South Korea 43-36. Both teams made it to the quarterfinals, but lost (Netherlands to France (gold medal winners), South Korea to Sweden (fourth place winners)).

The two countries also faced off in the finals of the mixed team Archery event where South Korea's Kim Je-deok and An San took gold in a 5-3 win.

See also 
 Foreign relations of the Netherlands
 Foreign relations of South Korea 
 South Korea–European Union relations

References

Netherlands–South Korea relations
Netherlands
Korea, South